Schizocosa is a genus of wolf spiders (family Lycosidae) containing around 60 species, distributed in North and South America, Africa, and East and Southeast Asia.

See also 
 List of Lycosidae species

References 
Schizocosa Chamberlin, 1904. World Spider Catalog (2015). Natural History Museum Bern, version 16, accessed on 22 May 2015

External links 

Lycosidae
Araneomorphae genera
Cosmopolitan spiders